Christina "Christa" Jaarsma (born 15 October 1952) is a retired speed skater from the Netherlands. She competed at the 1976 Winter Olympics in 500, 1000, 1500 and 3000 m and finished in 19th, 23rd, 16th and 20th place, respectively.

Personal bests: 
500 m – 45.15 (1976)
 1000 m – 1:28.10 (1976)
 1500 m – 2:16.97 (1976)
 3000 m – 4:52.05 (1976)

References

1952 births
Dutch female speed skaters
Speed skaters at the 1976 Winter Olympics
Olympic speed skaters of the Netherlands
Sportspeople from Almelo
Living people
20th-century Dutch women
21st-century Dutch women